Rodolfo Onetto was an Argentine actor. He was born in Santiago, Chile in 1913 but he emigrated to Argentina. He died in April 1983 (complications from Parkinson) in Buenos Aires.
He starred in the 1962 film Una Jaula no tiene secretos.

Films

References

External links

Argentine male film actors
Argentine people of Italian descent
Chilean emigrants to Argentina
Chilean people of Italian descent
Male actors from Santiago
1913 births
1983 deaths
20th-century Argentine male actors
Neurological disease deaths in Argentina
Deaths from Parkinson's disease